Sikfors is a village situated in Piteå Municipality, Norrbotten County, Sweden, with 211 inhabitants in 2005.

References

External links

Populated places in Piteå Municipality
Norrbotten